The name Seth has been used for three tropical cyclones worldwide, two in the Western Pacific ocean and one in the Australian Region.

in Western Pacific:
 Typhoon Seth (1991) – a powerful category 4 typhoon made landfall in the Philippines as a Tropical Storm.
 Typhoon Seth (1994) – a powerful category 4 typhoon that passed along the coast of China and hit South Korea.

Australian region:
 Cyclone Seth (2021) – a category 2 tropical cyclone (australian scale) that affected the northeastern states of Australia.
After the 2021-22 season, the name Seth was removed from the Australian name list.

Pacific typhoon set index articles
Australian region cyclone set index articles